The Second Paksas Cabinet was the 11th cabinet of Lithuania since 1990. It consisted of the Prime Minister and 13 government ministers (Ministry of Government Reforms and Municipalities was merged into the Ministry of the Interior at the start of the term).

History 
Rolandas Paksas, the leader of the Liberal Union of Lithuania, was appointed the Prime Minister by President Valdas Adamkus on 27 October 2000, after the elections earlier in October. Paksas had previously headed a Homeland Union government in 1999. The 11th government, consisting of the "New Politics" coalition led by the Liberal Union and the New Union (Social Liberals), received its mandate and started its work on 9 November 2000, after the Seimas gave assent to its program.

This government was the first one formed without the Democratic Labour Party of Lithuania or the Homeland Union since 1992.

The government served for less than a year before disagreements within the coalition brought it down. By the mid-June, 2001 New Union (Social Liberals) started negotiations with Social Democratic Party of Lithuania. The government, led by Rolandas Paksas, resigned on 20 June 2001, but continued to serve in an acting capacity, with Eugenijus Gentvilas as the acting Prime Minister, until the new government, headed by Algirdas Brazauskas started its work on 12 July 2001.

Cabinet
The following ministers served on the Second Paksas Cabinet.

References 

Cabinet of Lithuania
2000 establishments in Lithuania
2001 disestablishments in Lithuania
Cabinets established in 2000
Cabinets disestablished in 2001